Crash and Burn is a memoir by the American comedian Artie Lange. The book was published by Touchstone Books on October 29, 2013. The book has appeared on The New York Times Bestseller List.

Background
In a September 2013, interview with The Tampa Tribune, Artie Lange spoke about the book, saying: "The new book is the most honest thing I've ever done in my life. I just had to look at it again with my lawyer and I barely could get through it. It's about the last four years, when I was in mental institutions, rehabs, hurting myself, being in the hospital. It just starts to show how a successful guy and self-made man has everything go down the toilet because of a drug habit. It's the only thing standing between him being multi-multimillionaire. But I'm off the drugs now. Now it's just eating."

References

2013 non-fiction books
Comedy books
Collaborative memoirs
Show business memoirs
Touchstone Books books